Prigoria is a commune in Gorj County, Oltenia, Romania. It is composed of seven villages: Bucșana, Burlani, Călugăreasa, Dobrana, Negoiești, Prigoria and Zorlești.

References

Communes in Gorj County
Localities in Oltenia